The 2021 West Oxfordshire District Council election took place on 6 May 2021 to elect members of West Oxfordshire District Council in Oxfordshire, England. One third of the council was up for election and the Conservative Party stayed in overall control of the council, although with a reduced majority.

Results summary

Ward results

Bampton and Clanfield

Chadlington and Churchill

Charlbury and Finstock

Chipping Norton

Eynsham and Cassington

Freeland and Hanborough

Hailey, Minster Lovell and Leafield

Kingham, Rollright and Enstone

Milton-under-Wychwood

North Leigh

Standlake, Aston and Stanton

Stonesfield and Tackley

Witney Central

Witney East

Witney North

Witney South

Witney West

Woodstock and Bladon

References

West Oxfordshire District Council elections
2020s in Oxfordshire
West Oxfordshire
May 2021 events in the United Kingdom